Monkey Grip is a 1982 Australian drama film directed by Ken Cameron. It is based on the novel, also titled Monkey Grip (1977), by Helen Garner. It was screened in the Un Certain Regard section the 1982 Cannes Film Festival. The film was produced by Patricia Lovell and stars Noni Hazelhurst and Colin Friels, and featured an original soundtrack by Australian rock band the Divinyls.

Plot
Nora, a single-mother in her thirties living in Melbourne is engaged in an on-again off-again relationship with the heroin addict Javo, who can never quite decide whether he wants his freedom, or romantic commitment. The further their relationship progresses, the harder they find it to let go.

Cast
 Noni Hazlehurst as Nora
 Colin Friels as Javo
 Alice Garner as Gracie
 Harold Hopkins as Willie
 Candy Raymond as Lillian
 Michael Caton as Clive
 Tim Burns as Martin
 Christina Amphlett as Angela
 Don Miller-Robinson as Gerald
  Lisa Peers as Rita
 Cathy Downes as Eve
 Justin Ridley as Roaster
 Pearl Christie as Juliet
 Vera Plevnik as Jessie
 Jamie Fonti as Ramondo

Production
Ken Cameron tried to get up a film version of Helen Garner's novel in early 1979 but could not raise the budget of $553,000. Shooting was postponed until Patricia Lovell managed to get the money under 10BA tax regulations. However, by then costs had risen so much the film had to be made for $1 million. The film was shot in early 1981. The story is set in Melbourne but only one week of filming took place there, with Sydney standing in for the location. The Fitzroy Pool was recreated in Sydney's Ryde pool. The iconic Deep Water Aqua Profonda sign, at the Fitzroy public swimming pool, was economically reused as the album cover in the film.

Scriptwriter/ producer Briann Kearney was Production Co-ordinator.

Box office
Monkey Grip grossed $451,000 at the box office in Australia, which is equivalent to $1,312,410 in 2009 dollars. However it struggled to find distribution overseas.

Reception
The film received mixed reviews. Helen Garner, who wrote the novel upon which the film was based, had a problem with the casting of Colin Friels as a heroin addict. She stated: "I just can't believe they cast Colin Friels as the junkie. That was such a terrible mistake. He was so healthy, a great big bouncing muscly surfing guy".

Home media
Umbrella Entertainment has released it in a three-disc DVD set with Puberty Blues and Dimboola.

References

External links

Monkey Grip at Oz Movies

1982 films
1982 drama films
Australian drama films
Films directed by Ken Cameron
Australian independent films
Films shot in Melbourne
Films set in Melbourne
Films scored by Bruce Smeaton
Fitzroy, Victoria
1982 independent films
1980s English-language films